The Order of Augustinian Recollects (OAR) is a mendicant Catholic religious order of friars and nuns. It is a reformist offshoot from the Augustinian hermit friars and follows the same Rule of St. Augustine.

History

The Order was founded in 16th-century Spain as a separate province of the Augustinian friars, under their own Vicar General. Through the 5th Determination of the Chapter of Toledo, it was decided that:

Their reform emphasized fidelity to the Rule of St. Augustine. The reformers placed special emphasis on community prayer and simplicity of life.

On June 5, 1621, the Recollects was raised to the level of an autonomous Religious Congregation, giving it the right to divide itself into provinces. The first Recollects reached Japan, by way of the Philippines in 1623.

In the 1800s, the Order was persecuted by Leftist Revolutionary governments in Spain and Colombia. During this period of persecution in Spain and Colombia, the existence of the Order was saved since the hostile leftist governments reconsidered the missionary character of the Order since it held mission fields in the Philippines which was in sore need of religious ministers who were often the sole Spaniards and representatives of the empire among the vast frontier areas of the colony.

They were formally recognized as a Mendicant Order in the Catholic Church in 1912, the last to be so designated.

The Third Order of the Recollects of St. Augustine was set up to involve lay men and women. They publicly declare promises to seek to follow the teachings of St. Augustine. Modern changes in the Roman Catholic Church have led to an increased emphasis on the laity in the work of the Church. As part of the Order, they now share in the work of the friars, and have been reorganized as the Secular Augustinian Recollects.

Global presence

In 1997, the Recollects numbered 1,258 in 201 religious houses, distributed into eight provinces (regions) in four continents, but strongest in Spain, the Philippines and Colombia. The official languages of the Order are Spanish, English, and Portuguese.

Augustinian Recollects in the Philippines

With their arrival in May 1606 from Spain, the Recollects became one of the most important groups in the history of the evangelization of the Philippines. Many times, the areas given to this Order were the poorest islands in the archipelago, the ones not desired by other orders because of distance from the mainland.

Being a contemplative Order, it was not really their main goal to evangelize the country, but they became more active in the Philippines from 1606 to 1898, and later some missionaries spread the Recollect mission in Central America and in other parts of the world. Most of their houses were just formation centers, but they opened them to the public because the faithful would go and attend Sunday services with the friars.

Their first house was built in Bagumbayan, outside the walls of Manila. Later, they also built a house, San Nicolas de Tolentino Church, within the walls that became their house for the next hundreds of years after the British demolished all structures in Bagumbayan during their occupation of the city in the 1760s. The convent was destroyed during the World War II liberation of Manila.  Instead of rebuilding, the Order moved to its present house, then San Sebastian Church, in Quiapo, Manila.

Their first parish was in Masinloc, Zambales. However, this has already been transferred to the management of the diocese. Other parishes that were given to them early in their ministry in the Philippines were those of Mabalacat in Pampanga, Capas and Bamban in Tarlac province.

The Order also had missions in Palawan, Calamianes and Caraga (in the northeastern part of Mindanao). They laid the foundation for Puerto Princesa City, the capital of Palawan. Mindoro and Bohol became part of their missions as well.

The province that was most heavily influenced by the Order is the island of Negros now divided into two provinces, Occidental and Oriental. Most of the towns in both provinces are named after towns where the missionaries came from in Spain, such as La Carlota, Valencia, and Cádiz. The Recollect friars form a significant segment of the clergy.

Since the creation of the Province of Saint Ezekiél Moreno on November 28, 1998, the Philippine Province was officially separated from the Province of San Nicolas de Tolentino. Now, the Philippine Province supervises not only the different missions in the Philippines but also in Sierra Leone and Taiwan.

OAR learning institutions
The Order administers two universities: the University of Negros Occidental-Recoletos in Bacolod founded in 1941 and University of San Jose - Recoletos in Cebu City founded in 1947. They also administer two colleges - the San Sebastian College - Recoletos in Manila (with extension campus in Canlubang) founded in 1941 and the San Sebastian College - Recoletos de Cavite in Cavite City that was founded in 1966.  They also manage four secondary schools namely Colegio de Santo Tomas-Recoletos in San Carlos City, Colegio San Nicolas de Tolentino - Recoletos in Talisay City both in Negros Occidental, and the two San Pedro Academy in the Brgys. Poblacion and Caidiocan in Valencia, Negros Oriental.

Augustinian Recollects in Taiwan
The Recollect foundation in Taiwan is based at Kaohsiung City. They are supported by Filipino Recollects from the Province of St. Ezekiel Moreno.

Cardinal
The first priest from the Order of Augustinian Recollects elevated to the cardinalate was José Luis Lacunza Maestrojuán, Bishop of David in the Republic of Panama, elevated by Pope Francis on February 14, 2015.

Secular Augustinian Recollects
The Secular Augustinian Recollects (together composed a body called the Secular Augustinian Recollect Fraternity or SARF) is the Third Order of the Order of Augustinian Recollects. Being a full member of the OAR Family, they share in the charism of the Order and in turn share in the graces bestowed upon the First Order and the Second Order.

Today, the SARF is present in 15 countries, divided into 111 local chapters and totals to about 3500 members. like the Recollect priests and nuns, full-fledged members of the Third Order attach the SAR to their names.

History
Like the Third Order of the Augustinians, the Secular Augustinian Recollects trace back its history in the middle ages. On 5 December 1588, a number of religious of the Augustinian Province of Castile, moved by a special collective charism, expressed with renewed fervour, and according to new norms, their desire to live the type of consecrated life which Saint Augustine established in the Church, illustrated by his doctrine and examples and ordered in his Holy Rule. Hence, the Augustinian Recollection came to be.

The first groups of tertiaries were recorded in the convents of Madrid, Alcalá, Nava del Rey. In Granada, there were known to exist two or three groups of mantelatas (Spanish members of the Third Order) between 1655 and 1676.

Notable members
 Alphonse Gallegos
 Magdalene of Nagasaki
 Laura Evangelista Alvarado Cardozo

Nuns
In the convent at Cybar, Mariana Manzanedo of St. Joseph instituted a reform which led to the establishment of a third, that of the female Augustinian Recollects. The statutes, drawn up by Father Antinólez, and later confirmed by Paul V, bound the sisters to the strictest interpretation of the rules of poverty and obedience, and a rigorous penitential discipline.

See also
 The Augustinian Recollect Province of Saint Ezequiél Moreno

References

External links

 Order of Augustinian Recollects - official website
 Text of the Rule of St. Augustine

Mendicant orders
Recollect Augustinian Order
Catholic religious orders established in the 16th century
Notre Dame Educational Association